Bisa or BISA may refer to:

 Bisa (name), list of people with the name
 Belgian Institute for Space Aeronomy
 A Swedish nickname for the name Tobias
 The Bissa people tribe of Burkina Faso or their language, both sometimes spelled "Bisa"
 A surname or subcaste name of the Agrawal in India
 Bisa (island), an island in the Obi group of Indonesia
 Business Information Security Architect, a specialized role within the Information Security realm
 Bisa is a nickname for Biserka, a Serbo-Croat name meaning "pearly" for the  helmeted guineafowl
 The British International Studies Association.
 Battle Information System Application